Ihor Olehovych Kyryukhantsev (born 29 January 1996) is a Ukrainian professional footballer who plays as defender for Zorya Luhansk.

Career
Kyrykhantsev is a product of the FC Shakhtar youth academy and signed a contract with FC Shakhtar Donetsk in the Ukrainian Premier League in 2013.

He played in the Ukrainian Premier League Reserves and made his debut for Shakhtar Donetsk in the Ukrainian Premier League in a match against FC Oleksandriya on 31 May 2017.

References

External links
 
 

1996 births
Living people
Sportspeople from Makiivka
Ukrainian footballers
FC Shakhtar Donetsk players
FC Mariupol players
FC Oleksandriya players
FC Zorya Luhansk players
Association football defenders
Ukrainian Premier League players
Ukraine youth international footballers
Ukraine under-21 international footballers